Kawamae (written: 川前 lit. "in front of the river") is a Japanese surname. Notable people with the surname include:

, Japanese badminton player
, Japanese footballer

See also
, train station in Iwaki, Fukushima Prefecture, Japan

Japanese-language surnames